Dorothy H. Crawford FRSE OBE is professor of medical microbiology and assistant principal for public understanding of medicine at the University of Edinburgh. She has written a number of books on viruses.

Selected publications
 The Invisible Enemy: A Natural History of Viruses. Oxford University Press, Oxford, 2002.
 Virus Hunt. Oxford University Press, Oxford, 2013.
 Deadly Companions. Oxford University Press, Oxford, 2018.
 Viruses: A Very Short Introduction. Oxford University Press, Oxford, 2018.

References

External links
Crawford talking about The hunt for the origins of HIV.

Medical writers
Academics of the University of Edinburgh
Women microbiologists
Members of the Order of the British Empire
Fellows of the Royal Society of Edinburgh
Living people
Year of birth missing (living people)